The Trials of O'Brien is a 1965 television series starring Peter Falk as sordid, Shakespeare-quoting lawyer Daniel O'Brien, and featuring Elaine Stritch as his secretary and Joanna Barnes as his ex-wife.

The series ran for 22 episodes on CBS Television between September 18, 1965 and March 18, 1966.

Among its guest stars: Milton Berle, Robert Blake, David Carradine, Faye Dunaway, Britt Ekland, Tammy Grimes, Buddy Hackett, Gene Hackman, Frank Langella, Angela Lansbury, Cloris Leachman, Roger Moore, Rita Moreno, Pierre Olaf, Estelle Parsons, Joanna Pettet, Brock Peters, Tony Roberts, and Martin Sheen.

Falk often said that he actually liked this series much better than his later smash-hit Columbo.

Episodes

* Unknown

External links 

1965 American television series debuts
1966 American television series endings
CBS original programming
Television series by CBS Studios
American legal drama television series
Black-and-white American television shows
English-language television shows
Television series by Filmways